Beit Ezra (lit. House of Ezra) is a moshav in southern Israel. Located between Ashdod and Ashkelon on the Israeli coastal plain, it falls under the jurisdiction of Be'er Tuvia Regional Council.

History
The moshav was founded in 1950 by Jewish refugees from Iraq on the land  of the depopulated  Palestinian village of Hamama  and was named after Ezra. South of the moshav is Hill 69, which served as a military post and was the scene of fighting during the 1948 Arab–Israeli War. Also nearby is the Ad Halom bridge at which the Egyptian army was stopped during their advance towards Tel Aviv.

References

Moshavim
Populated places established in 1950
Populated places in Southern District (Israel)
1950 establishments in Israel
Iraqi-Jewish culture in Israel